Integrity Defines Strength, is the second EP by Sworn Enemy, released on Stillborn Records in 2002. It was re-released in 2004.

Track listing

Personnel
 Sal Lococo - vocals
 Lorenzo Antonucci - guitar
 Mike Raffinello - guitar
 Mike Couls - bass guitar
 Timmy Mycek - drums

Sworn Enemy albums
2002 EPs